The Goldstreifiger (Buprestis splendens) is a species of beetle in the family Buprestidae. It has a wide but scattered distribution from Western Europe to Russia; it is now extinct in Germany, Austria and probably Ukraine; it survives at three localities in Spain, two localities in Basilicata (Italy), Russia, Poland, southwestern Romania, Bosnia and Herzegovina, Albania and Greece. It lives in sun-exposed Pinus forest, and is threatened with extinction by logging. This species is listed on Appendix II of the Bern Convention and Annex II and IV of the EU Habitats Directive.

References

Buprestidae
Beetles of Europe
Beetles described in 1775
Taxa named by Johan Christian Fabricius
Taxonomy articles created by Polbot